Moniot de Paris (fl. post-1250) was a trouvère and probably the same person as the Monniot who wrote the Dit de fortune in 1278. He was once thought to have flourished around 1200, but his dates have been pushed back.

Moniot wrote nine surviving pieces: three pastourelles, one chanson de rencontre, one chanson de la malmariée, and four enigmatic rotrouenges that are not of the grand chant variety. Throughout, his work represents a blurring of the traditional boundaries between genres. One modern scholar, J. Frappier, has gone so far as to identify in him a new conception of courtly love: une courtoisie embourgeoisée (a bourgeoisie courtliness). Moniot represents a "low style" or "less refined lyricism". His themes, both lyric and musical, are light in tone. He uses refrains (such as the onomatopoeic "Vadu, vadu, vadu, va!") in nearly all his works and his melodies are simple in the extreme, with repeated notes, repeated phrases, and small intervals. These melodies were popular nonetheless: Moniot reused one and four of them have later contrafacta.

Poems
A une ajournee 
Au nouvel (or nouviau) tens que nest la violete 
Je chevauchoie l'autrier  
L'autrier par un matinet 
Li tens qui reverdoie 
Lonc tens ai mon tens usé 
Pour mon cuer releecier 
Quant je oi chanter l'alouete
Qui veut amours maintenir

References
Falck, Robert. "Moniot de Paris." Grove Music Online. Oxford Music Online. Accessed 14 August 2008. 
O'Neill, Mary (2006). Courtly Love Songs of Medieval France: Transmission and Style in the Trouvère Repertoire. Oxford: Oxford University Press. See "Songs of Moniot de Paris", pp. 135–52.

Trouvères
Male classical composers